Calvani is a surname. Notable people with the surname include:

Luca Calvani (born 1974), Italian actor
Marco Calvani (born 1980), Italian playwright, director, translator and actor
Sandro Calvani (born 1952), Italian humanitarian
Terry Calvani (born 1947), American lawyer, former government official and university professor